The Last Place God Made is a novel by British novelist Jack Higgins, published in 1971. It is about a bush pilot in the Amazon in the time immediately before the outbreak of the Second World War.

References

1971 British novels
Novels by Jack Higgins
Novels set in South America
Novels set in the 1930s
William Collins, Sons books
Amazon in fiction